Disporopsis is a genus of plants in the Asparagaceae. It is native to China, Indochina and the Philippines.

Disporopsis aspersa (Hua) Engl. ex Diels - Guangxi, Hubei, Hunan, Sichuan, Yunnan
Disporopsis bakerorum Floden, Yunnan
Disporopsis bodinieri (H.Lév.) Floden China (Yunnan, Guizhou, NW. Guangxi) to N. Vietnam
Disporopsis fuscopicta Hance - Philippines, Fujian, Guangdong, Guangxi, Guizhou, Hunan, Jiangxi, Sichuan, Yunnan 
Disporopsis jinfushanensis Z.Y.Liu - Sichuan
Disporopsis longifolia Craib - Laos, Thailand, Vietnam, Guangxi, Yunnan 
Disporopsis luzoniensis (Merr.) J.M.H.Shaw - Luzon
Disporopsis pernyi (Hua) Diels - Guangdong, Guangxi, Guizhou, Hunan, Jiangxi, Sichuan, Taiwan, Yunnan, Zhejiang
Disporopsis undulata Tamura & Ogisu - Sichuan
 Disporopsis yui Floden China (Yunnan) to N. Myanmar.

References

Agavoideae
Asparagaceae genera